Li Lu (born December 9, 1994) is a Chinese Paralympic athlete who competes in 200 metres and 400 metres events in international level. She had her left arm amputated after touching an electrical transformer.

References

1994 births
Living people
People from Dengzhou
People from Zhengzhou
Paralympic athletes of China
Chinese female sprinters
Athletes (track and field) at the 2016 Summer Paralympics
Medalists at the 2016 Summer Paralympics
Chinese amputees
Paralympic medalists in athletics (track and field)
Paralympic gold medalists for China
Paralympic bronze medalists for China
Athletes (track and field) at the 2020 Summer Paralympics
21st-century Chinese women